Oscar O'Neal Griffin Jr. (April 28, 1933 – November 23, 2011) was an American journalist.

Early life and education
Griffin was born in Daisetta, Texas and obtained his degree from the University of Texas in 1958. In 1982, he completed Harvard Business School's executive education program for Owner/President Management (OPM).

Career
Griffin was the editor of the Pecos Independent and Enterprise. During his time here, he was a reporter and editor. Prior to that time, he served in the Army in the 1950s. After graduating from the University of Texas, he worked at a number of small newspapers before his stint at the Pecos, Texas Independent and Enterprise. In 1962, he began working for the Houston Chronicle, where he was responsible for covering the Kennedy and Johnson administrations.

Griffin was assistant director of Public Affairs for the U.S. Department of Transportation in Washington, D.C. (1969-1974.) After coming back to Texas, he founded Griffin Well Service, an oil company in El Campo.

Awards and honors
Griffin won the 1963 Pulitzer Prize for Local Reporting (No Edition Time), as editor at the Independent and Enterprise, for directing its investigation of the fraud scandal involving Billie Sol Estes in 1962.

Family
Griffin was married to the former Patricia Lamb for 56 years. Together they had three daughters and a son: Gwendolyn Pryor, Amanda Ward, Marguerite Horne, and Gregory Griffin. They also had seven grandchildren.

Death
Griffin died in New Waverly, Texas where he lived, on November 23, 2011, at the age of 78, of cancer.

Publications

References

External links
 

1933 births
2011 deaths
Editors of Texas newspapers
Pulitzer Prize for Investigative Reporting winners
People from Liberty County, Texas
University of Texas at Austin alumni
Deaths from cancer in Texas
Nixon administration personnel
Journalists from Texas
Businesspeople from Texas
United States Army soldiers
Military personnel from Texas
20th-century American journalists
American male journalists
People from Pecos, Texas
People from New Waverly, Texas